Kēlen (pronounced [ˈke:.len]) is a constructed language created by Sylvia Sotomayor.  It is an attempt to create a truly alien language by violating a key linguistic universal—namely that all human languages have verbs.  In Kēlen, relationships between the noun phrases making up the sentence are expressed by one of four relationals.  According to Sotomayor, these relationals perform the functions of verbs but lack any of the semantic content.  However, the semantic content found in common verbs, such as those that are semantic primes, can also be found in Kēlen's relationals, which calls into question whether Kēlen is technically verbless.  Despite its distinctive grammar, Kēlen is an expressive and intelligible language;  texts written in Kēlen have been translated into other languages by several people other than the creator of the language. In an interview, Sotomayor states that she aims for Kēlen to be naturalistic apart from its verblessness, and that to achieve this she employs the principle "change one thing and keep everything else the same".

Background and history 
In its concultural setting, Kēlen is spoken by an alien species (the Kēleñi).

Kēlen is mentioned prominently by Sarah L. Higley in her book Hildegard of Bingen's Unknown Language: An edition, translation and discussion (Palgrave Macmillan 2007, The New Middle Ages) where she discusses Lingua Ignota in the context of constructed languages up to the present day. She describes it as an example of the desire for originality in contemporary conlanging, by virtue of its verbless grammar, and notes that it is a prominent example of a conlang created by a woman. She also says that "fellow conlangers consider Kēlen to be efficient, elegant, strange and innovative, and its writing system is greatly admired."
Kēlen is also discussed at length in this paper by  M. Yu. Sidorova and O.N. Shuvalova,
Several glossed examples are given.

At the third Language Creation Conference David J. Peterson awarded the Smiley Award to Kēlen, describing it as "an engineered language with the soul of an artistic language". He explains that while its experimental structure is in many ways similar to an engineered language, the amount of linguistic and concultural detail given by Sotomayor (including inflection of the relationals, three different scripts, and information on Kēleñi culture and society such as a calendar and a method of divination) make it a fully fledged artistic project rather than a simple experiment.

Phonology

Consonants 

Sylvia Sotomayor analyses the voiceless alveolar fricative /s/ as a stop, because "it used to be [pronounced] like German /z/ or /ts/. This pronunciation is still found in some dialects." In addition, all sonorants, except /ʎ/, can be geminated, as follows: mm /m:/, nn /n:/, ññ /ɲ:/, ŋŋ /ŋ:/, ll /l:/, rr /r:/.

Vowels 
Kēlen has the same five monophthongs as in Spanish, with the addition of vowel length and diphthongs making it similar to the system found in Hawaiian. Some dialects also use a central short monophthong.

Monophthongs

Diphthongs 
Sotomayor specifies that when any two vowels appear next to one another that are not specified as being read as diphthongs, they are instead spoken as two separate vowels.

Syllable Structure 
Kēlen uses a (C)V(C) syllable structure.

Writing systems 
The romanization of Kēlen is given in the phonology section next to the phonemes that each Latin character represents. However, Kēlen also features three original writing systems by Sylvia Sotomayor.

 Kēlen Writing System - While not given its own name by Sotomayor, the primary writing system of Kēlen is ostensibly an alphabet, and bears a superficial resemblance to Devanagari.
 Box Script - A variation upon the standard writing system which encloses text within a box.
 Ceremonial Interlace Alphabet - An alphabet used for ceremonial purposes where each character is represented by a pattern which crosses over itself, "interlacing." as Sotomayor says, "Letters start in the bottom right hand corner, and continue over - under - over - under (or under - over, etc.) until they end at the top right hand corner."

Grammar

Syntax 
The word order of Kēlen depends upon the relational used in a given sentence. However, adjectives always come after nouns.

Pronouns 
Personal pronouns in Kēlen have singular, dual, paucal, and plural forms, as well as distinctions of clusivity in the first-person.

Kēlen features reflexive pronouns, most of which can also be used as so-called "reduced" forms of the ordinary personal pronouns with the exception of the 3rd person inanimate, "ja". When used as reduced pronouns, some are considered more or less polite than others.

Le, ri, and ma can all be used as reduced forms of the singular, dual, and paucal of their corresponding full-length personal pronouns. Ma can be freely used in place of any 3rd person pronoun. Using le as a reduced pronoun is considered polite, ri is considered impolite, and ma is "neutral as far as politeness is concerned".

There are three demonstrative pronouns in Kēlen, distinguishing between the proximal, medial, and distal. They can be used as adjectives, and "generally follow the noun they modify, but can immediately precede it. They can also be used to reference a previously mentioned noun. However, in certain contexts, the noun they are assumed to modify is 'place'". The table below outlines potential uses of the demonstrative pronouns.

Indefinite pronouns in Kēlen function similarly to the demonstratives, where they can be used either as modifiers or standalone. Unlike the demonstratives, however, which indefinite is used depends upon number and animacy.

Nouns

Animacy 
Kēlen makes extensive use of a system of animacy, with a set of mandatory prefixes on all noun stems, the usage of which depends upon the speaker's view of what they are talking about. Sotomayor provides an animacy hierarchy as follows, with 1 being the most likely to be considered animate by any given speaker, and 7 the least:

 Kēleñi Kin
 Kēleñi Non-Kin
 Īrāñi & Humans
 Natural Forces, Pets
 Animals, Natural Objects
 Tools
 Everything Else

Prefixes are given for animate, inanimate, and possessed nouns. Sotomayor describes the latter as "[referring] to those inanimates that are considered to be part of a person, such as body parts."

Number 
Kēlen's nouns are suffixed for grammatical number, distinguishing between the singular and the plural. The suffixes used for the singular are dependent upon the ending of the noun stem, and the suffixes for the plural depend upon the animacy.

Relationals 
According to Sotomayor, in lieu of verbs Kēlen uses four so-called "Relationals". She describes these on her site with examples of the potential uses of each within the context of larger sentences, with the abbreviation "NP" for "Noun Phrase".

La 
La is the relational of existence: "La is used to express a static state, a location, or equivalence." It inflects for tense, aspect, and modality.

Ñi 
Ñi is the relational of change: "Ñi is used to express a coming into existence, a change in state (when the noun phrase that is the object of ñi has more than one noun in it), or a change in location." Ñi inflects for agent.

Se 
Se is the transactional relational, "Se is used to express giving and receiving, with the object given or received as the object of se and the giver as the source and the receiver as the beneficiary. This pattern is extended to encompass speech and information. Se is also used to express sensing and experiencing of mental states." Se inflects for source, beneficiary and tense.

Pa 
Pa is the most recent relational in-fiction, "In many ways it expresses the same thing as LA NP pa NP", but indicates a passive meaning. Pa is never inflected.

References

External links 

 An Introduction to Kēlen
 "Verblessness in Kēlen", presented at the 2nd Language Creation Conference

Artistic languages
Constructed languages
Constructed languages introduced in the 1990s
1998 introductions